The Judiciary of Zambia is the branch of the Government of the Republic of Zambia which interprets and applies the country's laws to ensure impartial justice under law and to provide a mechanism for dispute resolution. Under the 1991 Constitution, justices and magistrates are independent of the government and subject only to the Constitution and the law.

According to the constitutional amendments of Act No. 2 of 2016, the structure of the judicature shall comprise the Supreme Court, with an equal ranking to the Constitutional Court, the appeals court, the High Court, the Subordinate Court, the Local Court and such lower Courts as may be prescribed by an Act of Parliament.

The functions of the Judiciary include the administration of justice through resolving disputes between individuals or between individual and the state, interpreting the constitution and the laws of Zambia, promoting the rule of law, and protecting the human rights of individuals and groups.

Supreme Court

The Supreme Court of Zambia is the final Court of appeal and has the final say in all legal matters, including the interpretation of the Constitution. It consists of the Chief Justice, the Deputy Chief Justice and seven or more Supreme Court Judges. It is located in Independence Avenue, Lusaka.

High court
The High court's role is judicial review, in other terms interpretation of the law. They have the power to declare any law or ordinance unconstitutional if it is found to be against the Zambian Constitution. A High Court alone can certify the cases fit for appeal before the Supreme Court.

This court can be categorized into three separate courts namely family courts, business court and industrial relations.

Industrial relations courts

Subordinate courts
These are the lower courts and the courts of the first instance, and are graded as first, second or third class. They can decide all matters except for offences of treason, murder and all matters that involve interpretations of the Constitution and are presided over by Resident Magistrates of appropriate status.

Small claims courts
The Small Claims Courts deal with minor financial claims (less than K 20m) except in certain circumstances.

Local courts
The Local Courts operate within territorial limits and are graded Grade A or Grade B according to the value of the claims they can consider. They are also limited in terms of the severity of the sentences they can impose.

Chief Justice
The Chief Justice of Zambia is an ex-officio Judge of the High Court.

List of Chief Justices

1964–1965: Sir Diarmaid Conroy
1966–1969: John Ramsey Blagden
1969: James John Skinner (afterwards Chief Justice of Malawi, 1970)
1969–1975: Brian Andre Doyle
1975–1992: Annel Silungwe
1992–2002: Matthew M.S.W. Ngulube
2003–2011: Ernest L. Sakala
 2012–2015: Mrs Lombe Chibesakunda (acting)
2015–2021: Irene Chirwa Mambilima
2021–present: Mumba Malila

References

 
Government of Zambia
Law of Zambia
Zambian judges